Barathkumar a/l Ramaloo (born 23 April 1992) is a Malaysian professional footballer who plays for Negeri Sembilan as a midfielder.

Club Career 
He signed a contract with Negeri Sembilan FC in 2021. He has made 20 appearances and scored 5 goals while with Negeri Sembilan FC. After spending only one season with Negeri Sembilan FC, he was transferred to Petaling Jaya City FC in 2022.

In 2023 he returned to join the team Negeri Sembilan FC on a free transfer after spent one year with the team in 2021. He was officially announced as a new Negeri Sembilan FC player on January 9, 2023.

Personal life
Aroon has a brother, Aroon Kumar, who is also a professional footballer.

References

External links 

1992 births
Living people
Malaysian footballers
Malaysia Super League players
Young Fighters F.C. players
Melaka United F.C. players
Petaling Jaya City FC players
Negeri Sembilan FA players
Negeri Sembilan FC players
Malaysian people of Tamil descent
Malaysian sportspeople of Indian descent
Association football forwards
Association football midfielders
People from Negeri Sembilan